The Changhe Z-11 is  a light utility helicopter developed by Changhe Aircraft Industries Corporation (CAIC). According to the Changhe Aircraft Industries Corporation website, it is claimed to be the first indigenously-designed helicopter in China. However, it is largely based on the Eurocopter AS350 Écureuil.

Development 
The Z-11 project started in 1989 and the first flight was made in Dec 1994. In Oct 2000, test flights of Z-11 were completed.  The chief designer of Z-11 is Mr. Wu Ximing (吴希明), who is also the chief designer of three other Chinese helicopters, including the Z-10. Under Mr. Wu, the Z-11 became the first Chinese helicopter to be completely designed using CAD/CAM techniques.

The Z-11WB, the attack and reconnaissance variant, features pintle mount weapons and two weapon pylons on each side of the aircraft. The engine is replaced by Turbomeca Arriel 2B1A turboshaft engine developing 632 kW (848 shp) of power.

Variants 
Z-11 original unarmed version.
Z-11W military version of the Z-11 (battlefield surveillance and reconnaissance, ground attack, and medical evacuation roles)
Z-11WA military reconnaissance and observation helicopter, fitted with a sensor pod.
Z-11MB1 civilian and commercial version fitted with French Arriel 2B1A engine
Z-11ME1 export civilian and commercial version.
CZ-11W export light attack helicopter variation. It is powered by one WZ-8D, LTS101-700D-2 or Arriel 2B1A turboshaft engine and is equipped with integrated avionics systems, antitank missiles, rockets and machine guns. The helicopter is fitted with a targeting sensor turret, and can carry four Chinese HJ-8 antitank missiles.
Z-11WB First flight on 28 September 2015. Officially unveiled at Zhuhai Airshow on 1 November 2016. Enhanced attack/reconnaissance variant with a new EO ball, redesigned cockpit, SW-6 UAV, and pylons for weapons. Its roles include ground support, attack, battlefield reconnaissance, command, counter-terrorism, counter-narcotics, counter-smuggling, and other tasks.

Specifications (Z-11J)

See also

References

External links 

 Introduction from Changhe Aircraft Industries
 SinoDefence.com article

1990s Chinese military utility aircraft
Military helicopters
Changhe aircraft
1990s Chinese helicopters
Single-turbine helicopters
Aircraft first flown in 1994